Vasilios Tsiartas (born 12 November 1972) is a Greek former professional footballer who played as an attacking midfielder. Although he was famed for his lackadaisical playing style, his ability was never in question and he was in many ways the epitome of a classic "number 10" player. "El Mago", as was his nickname, was naturally left-footed but was just as dangerous with his right foot. A great football mind, a literally world-class vertical pass, amazing set-up and amazing long-range shots. His racing flaw was his lack of speed, which, however, was overshadowed by his great technical skills. Also characteristic of the incredible potential of his left foot is the fact that in addition to the many goals he scored with free kicks, long and short shots and penalties, sometimes in his career he scored with direct corner kicks. Thus, Tsiartas was the main set piece taker for the national and his club team. He was an important member of Greece, claiming two assists in Portugal towards Greece's ultimate victory at UEFA Euro 2004. In his entire career he did not receive a single red card. Although he played as a passer, Tsiartas was capable of scoring many goals due to his deadly footage and scoring abilities being one of AEK Athens' top scorers. He is considered one of the best Greek players in history.

Club career

Early years
Tsiartas began his career at the academy at AE Alexandris and later the team of Naoussa, which also produced players such as Vasilios Lakis and Dimitris Markos. His performance for Naousa, gained the interest of the big teams, mainly AEK Athens and Panathinaikos.

AEK Athens
On 30 November 1992, he was transferred to AEK for a fee of 100,000,000 drachmas. He showed samples of his rare class with a characteristic debut on 12 December 1992, in which he scored two goals in a 7–0 victory against Korinthos in Nea Filadelfeia. However, in his first 18 months within the club were a period of adjustment and thus he was between substitutes and starters. At the end of the season AEK won the league, which was followed by another one at the end of the following season, with Tsiartas gaining an ever-increasing role within the team. On 20 April 1994 he had one of the worst moments of his career missing his penalty, in the penalty shoot-out, in the Cup Final against Panathinaikos, in one of the best Greek cup finals of all time, which AEK lost by 4–2. In 1994 he played in the first ever group stage of the Champions League, where he made several very good appearances in domestic competitions. In 1996 he emerged as the league's top scorer making the best season of his career with 26 goals in 33 league matches, achieving and many impressive goals, while he also scored many assists for his teammates, while he also scored 7 goals in the Cup, which AEK won in the end with a record score of 7–1, with Tsiartas scoring a hat-trick. He was voted the best Greek football player of the league alongside Vassilis Karapialis and Giorgos Donis by his colleagues in the league.

Sevilla
This and his huge attacking presence lead to a move to Sevilla for a fee of 500,000,000 drachmas (€1.5 million). There, he was an influential captain and vital in team gaining promotion to the Primera Division. He was known in Seville as "El Mago" ("The Magician") due to his lethal ability with any free kicks combined with a powerful shot in or outside the box. He was also loved by the Sevilla fans and was one of the most important "10s" of the Andalusian team's history. He played four seasons in Andalusia, while he was also the leader of the team.

Return to AEK Athens
Tsiartas returned to AEK Athens on 6 July 2000 for record fee of 1,400,000,000 drachmas (€3.5 million) on another successful four-year spell at AEK. He was now the "maestro" of the build-up of the game, wearing his favorite "10" on the back, while he scored very often. He scored a total of 43 goals for the championship during his second spell in the team, he created a lot of goals for his teammates, while he was also an awesome duo with Demis Nikolaidis. On 27 April 2002 he won yet another Cup with AEK beating Olympiacos by 2–1 at the Olympic Stadium. He made a memorable appearance in the Champions League match in Nea Filadelfeia against Real Madrid in a 3–3 draw, when he scored an amazing goal with a foul and assisted two more goals, one by Christos Maladenis with a corner and one by Demis Nikolaidis also with an excellent foul. In total, Tsiartas had 196 appearances in AEK in the Greek championship and 80 goals, many of which are particularly impressive and today he is in the top 10 of the all time scorers of AEK for the championship. He also had 24 participations with 12 goals in the cup and 49 games with 10 goals in European games becoming 3rd scorer in the history of the team until today in European games, behind Demis Nikolaidis and Mimis Papaioannou.

Later years
In the summer of 2004 Tsiartas left AEK and 30 November he signed for 1. FC Köln, where he won the 2. Bundesliga in 2005. However, he wasn't able to help his club due to an injury and as a result his contract was terminated on 23 June 2005. Afterwards he initially ended his career, but he returned to action on 5 October 2006, by signing at Ethnikos Piraeus. On 14 February 2007 he eventually announced his retirement from professional football.

International career
Having played at under-16 and under-21 level, Tsiartas made his debut for men's team on 27 April 1994 in a game against Saudi Arabia. He managed to score 12 goals in his 70 caps with Greece including an important penalty against Northern Ireland in 2003 which led to Greece's qualification for Euro 2004. He also assisted three other goals during the campaign, the most of any Greek player. During the Euro 2004 he was used mainly as a substitute by the team's coach Otto Rehhagel, but managed to claim two vital assists, one against Spain and the other against the Czech Republic on the way to Greece's victory in the tournament.

Post-playing career
After his playing days were over, Tsiartas became a playr agent. On 22 May 2012 he was took over the technical leader ship of AEK Athens, but he was fired on 26 October due to disagrements with the management.

Career statistics

International

Scores and results list Greece's goal tally first, score column indicates score after each Tsiartas goal.

Honours

Naoussa
Beta Ethniki: 1992–93

AEK Athens
Alpha Ethniki: 1992–93, 1993–94
Greek Cup: 1995–96, 2001–02

Köln
2. Bundesliga: 2004–05

Greece
UEFA European Championship: 2004

Individual
Alpha Ethniki top scorer: 1995–96
Greek Footballer of the year: 1996

References

External links

Tsartas, el 'sabio griego' del equipo de Rehhagel 
Uefa.com: Tsiartas signs off with pride

1972 births
Living people
Greek footballers
Greece international footballers
Greece under-21 international footballers
Association football midfielders
Greek Macedonians
UEFA Euro 2004 players
UEFA European Championship-winning players
2005 FIFA Confederations Cup players
AEK Athens F.C. players
Naoussa F.C. players
Sevilla FC players
La Liga players
1. FC Köln players
Expatriate footballers in Germany
Ethnikos Piraeus F.C. players
Super League Greece players
Football League (Greece) players
AEK F.C. non-playing staff
Footballers from Alexandreia, Greece